Tasmania Police is the primary law enforcement agency of the Australian state of Tasmania. Established in 1899, the force has more than 1,300 officers policing Tasmania's population of over half a million people.

History

Colonial history
Prior to the formation of a unified police force, the colony of Tasmania (then called Van Diemen's Land) was policed from 1803 under the administration of Lieutenant Governor David Collins by a small number of superintendents and overseers, and from 1804 by a civilian body known as the "Night Watch", brought by Collins from Port Phillip Bay. The Night Watch was disbanded in 1806 due to ineffectiveness and was replaced by British military patrols. A municipal police force was established at Port Dalrymple (Launceston) on 19 November 1804, with Thomas Massey as Chief Constable.

Formation

With the introduction of the Police Regulation Act 1898, one unified police force was established which came into being on 1 January 1899. George Richardson was appointed the first Commissioner of the new force, and he quickly implemented several structural changes to the existing municipal policing areas, amalgamating them into 14 districts between a total of 246 police members. The early police officers were to undertake a wide variety of tasks from compiling the electoral roll in 1903, to tracking missing rifles from the Tasmanian contingent to the Second Boer War. Richardson complained frequently about the workload placed upon his officers, until a Royal Commission in 1905 recommended his replacement. William Hunt was appointed as Richardson's replacement but died before he could take office, and Colonel John Lord took his place, serving as Commissioner for 16 years with a break to serve with the First Australian Imperial Force during World War I.

Modernisation and present day

The Police Act 1905 defined and expanded the powers of Tasmania Police, which included liquor and lodging licensing, dog registration, vehicle regulation and disorderly conduct. In October 1917, the force appointed its first female police officer, Kate Campbell, and in 1918 two women were added to police staff primarily to police child protection laws. As of 30 June 2020, around 34 per cent of Tasmania Police officers were female.

By 1922, Tasmania Police had 235 police officers.

In 2004 the Police Regulation Act 1898 was finally repealed and the new  was proclaimed. The new Act retained a number of features of the old Act but the most controversial change was that of the powers of the Commissioner, including powers to test police officers for drugs and alcohol, integrity testing and the power to seek details of an officer's financial position. The powers of the Commissioner may, generally speaking, only be used if there is some sort of suspicion attached to an individual police officer.

Structure
Tasmania Police is part of the Tasmanian Government's Department of Police, Fire and Emergency Management, which also consists of the State Emergency Service, Forensic Science Service Tasmania and the Tasmania Fire Service.

The Commissioner of Police also serves as the secretary of the Department of Police, Fire and Emergency Management, and the State Emergency Management Controller.

Jurisdiction

The force is divided into three geographical district commands: Southern, Northern and Western. Each district is divided into several geographical divisions, and is administered by a Commander. There are 67 police stations across the state, ranging from state-of-the-art urban facilities to regional and remote police houses in the state's highlands, and on King Island and Flinders Island.

Support commands
Tasmania Police comprises four support commands which support the geographical districts:
 Education and Training
 Operations Support (incorporating Firearms Services, Forensic Services, Investigative and Intelligence Support Services, Marine and Rescue Services, Radio Dispatch Services, Safe Families Coordination Unit, Serious Organised Crime Division, State Community Policing)
 Professional Standards
 Special Response and Counter-Terrorism (incorporating Policy Development, Emergency and Risk Management, Special Operations Group, Protective Security)

Rank structure

Tasmania Police has a similar rank structure to other policing agencies in Australia.

Commissioners
The following police officers have been promoted in rank and appointed to serve as the Commissioner of Tasmania Police:

Tasmania Police Academy
The Tasmania Police Academy is located in the suburb of Rokeby on Hobart's Eastern Shore.

Local training of police officers in Tasmania began in 1958 at Sackville Street in Hobart. In 1960, Commissioner Delderfield suggested the establishment of a police training college on Hobart's eastern shore, and the idea was discussed until Commissioner Phil Fletcher managed to get the proposal approved by cabinet on 16 December 1969. Several sites were considered until Rokeby was selected.

The main road into the Tasmania Police Academy, Phil Fletcher Drive, was named in his honour.

The Academy was officially opened on 6 March 1976 by the Premier of Tasmania, Bill Neilson. The Tasmania Police Academy was the first purpose-built Police Academy in Australia.

The Tasmania Police Academy offers training for Tasmania Police recruits, currently serving Tasmania Police officers, and is offered as a community resource to various local community groups.

Equipment

Firearms
The general-issue Glock 17 9-mm semi-automatic pistol retains the "three-tier" safety features of the original model, and does not include any special features specific to Tasmania Police. Contrary to popular belief, there was never a Glock model specifically developed for use that was unique to Tasmania Police. Tasmania Police underwent a period of individual issue of the weapon until the adoption of the Glock 17 as the standard-issue weapon in 1999. The Smith and Wesson Model 10 revolver is no longer issued or carried by Tasmania Police.

The Glock 19 compact pistol has been issued mainly to traffic sections, and the Glock 26 sub-compact model was adopted as the general-issue sidearm for detectives and covert units. A degree of individual preference of model adopted by the individual officer exists to this day.

Operational equipment
In addition to firearms, police are also equipped with an expandable baton and OC spray. In April 2015, the Multiuse Integrated Protection Vest (MIPV) was issued, a combination of a load bearing vest and a Ballistic vest, with a high visibility over garment, together with a new uniform.

Tasmania Police evaluated the use of taser stun guns in 2009, but the decision was made not to issue tasers to front-line officers. Currently, only officers of the Special Operations Group and the emergency response team at Risdon Prison Complex are authorised to carry tasers.

In August 2018, Tasmania Police began the rollout of body worn cameras to frontline officers, as part of a $3.4 million program to deploy them across the whole force over four years.

Vehicles

The first radio-equipped vehicles adopted by Tasmania Police were FX Holden sedans, with ten of these acquired in 1950. Ford Fairlane cars were adopted in 1960 for use by the Criminal Investigative Branch, and over the years various makes of Holden, Ford and Toyota have been used. Notably the Traffic division adopted Nissan Skyline Silhouette pursuit cars in the late 1980s.

Tasmania Police vehicles are based around several platforms, including the Holden Commodore, Ford Falcon, and more recently the Kia Stinger and Subaru Liberty for general (urban) patrol. Various other makes and models are employed on a "best-suitability" basis for rural, investigative, personnel transport and general inquiry roles including a range of mid-sized vehicles from Toyota and Hyundai. The Ford Ranger and Toyota Hilux are currently used as base vehicles for divisional vans, fitted with a custom Vawdrey-brand rotary-moulded, "custody cell" for transport of prisoners. Divisional vans are also predominantly used as patrol-support vehicles, to transport people under-arrest who have displayed a propensity for violence.

The BMW R1200RT-P motorcycle is the primary motorcycle used in Tasmania, to supplement traffic control and enforcement duties, as well as assist with dignitaries and official ceremonial duties.

Tasmania Police general patrol vehicles are equipped with mobile data terminals, used to interrogate criminal and traffic databases. They also have a general exemption against the Tasmanian government's "green-fleet" designations, as most vehicles under this designation are unsuitable for policing duties, and do not comply with Australian standards for the minimum requirements for Australian police vehicles.

Tasmania Police Pipe Band
The Tasmania Police Pipe Band was formed in 1969, and wears the Fletcher of Dunans tartan in honour of the Commissioner of Police at the time Mr PW Fletcher. The band is also recognised as the marching band for the Royal Tasmania Regiment, and wears the regiment badge with rosette device on its tartan.

Tasmania Police Medal
The Tasmania Police Medal is awarded to sworn officers of the Tasmania Police, for diligent and ethical service.

The medal is circular and nickel-silver, with the obverse featuring the outline of Tasmania emblazoned with the heraldic lion in the centre. The words Tasmania Police around the central device, and 'For diligent and ethical service' around the vertical edges. The ribbon is the same as some other state police medals.

See also
Tasmania Police Special Operations Group

References

External links 

 

Law enforcement agencies of Tasmania
Government agencies established in 1899
Emergency services in Tasmania
1899 establishments in Australia